João Pedro Sousa Silva (born 13 November 1996), known as João Pedro, is a Portuguese professional footballer who plays for Super League Greece club Panetolikos as a forward.

Club career
Born in Ponta Delgada in the Azores, João Pedro was a junior at hometown club C.D. Santa Clara when he made his professional debut in Segunda Liga on 23 November 2013, as a half-time substitute for Tiago Leonço in a 1–0 home loss against S.C. Braga B. The following 25 January, he scored his only goal for the team in a 3–1 away defeat to S.C. Farense.

After two seasons with Gil Vicente F.C. in the second division and as many with C.D. Trofense in the third, João Pedro signed a one-year contract with Primeira Liga side Vitória S.C. on 5 July 2019, with the option of two more. He made his debut on 1 August in a 4–0 home win (5–0 aggregate) over AS Jeunesse Esch of Luxembourg in the second qualifying round of the UEFA Europa League, playing the last seven minutes in place of Alexandre Guedes. Thirteen days later, again from the bench and at the Estádio D. Afonso Henriques, he scored his first goal in a 6–0 demolition of Latvia's FK Ventspils.

João Pedro scored twice from ten league appearances in his first season in Guimarães, starting with the only goal of a home win against former club Santa Clara on 18 January 2020, again as a substitute. On 1 July, he agreed to a new deal of two years with the option of as many more.

However, on 20 August 2020, João Pedro joined F.C. Paços de Ferreira on a three-year contract. Vitória retained a percentage of his economic rights, and a buyback option.

International career
João Pedro represented Portugal at under-20 level, appearing in the 2016 Toulon Tournament.

References

External links

Portuguese League profile 

1996 births
Living people
People from Ponta Delgada
Portuguese sportspeople of Bissau-Guinean descent
Portuguese footballers
Association football forwards
Primeira Liga players
Liga Portugal 2 players
Campeonato de Portugal (league) players
CU Micaelense players
C.D. Santa Clara players
Gil Vicente F.C. players
C.D. Trofense players
Vitória S.C. B players
Vitória S.C. players
F.C. Paços de Ferreira players
TFF First League players
Bursaspor footballers
Super League Greece players
Panetolikos F.C. players
Portugal youth international footballers
Portuguese expatriate footballers
Expatriate footballers in Turkey
Expatriate footballers in Greece
Portuguese expatriate sportspeople in Turkey
Portuguese expatriate sportspeople in Greece